Bridal wreath or bridalwreath is a common name for several plants and may refer to:

Francoa, especially:
Francoa sonchifolia, endemic to Chile
Spiraea prunifolia, native to Japan, Korea, and China
Tetilla hydrocotylefolia